Bert Shankland (12 September 1932 - 26 January 2012) was an East African Safari Rally driver and champion from Scotland. He worked in Tanzania from the 1950s to the 1970s. He won the Safari rally twice in 1966 and 1967 driving Peugeot 404s.

References 

Safari Rally